The Real Sociedad de Tenis de la Magdalena ("Royal Society of Tennis of la Magdalena"), commonly known as El Tenis de Santander and familiarly as El Tenis, is a private country club based in Santander, Cantabria, Spain. Founded by king Alfonso XIII and a group of noblemen in April 1906, it is one of the oldest country clubs in Spain.

The club is located in the Magdalena Peninsula, and has over 8,000 members, having sports sections of tennis, hockey, roller hockey, swimming, bowling, and canoeing.

Currently membership is largely reserved for the children and spouses of members only, being very restrictive towards people wishing to become affiliates.

History

First half of the 20th century

Early in the century a group of noblemen decided to create a sports club which they christened as Lawn-tenis Society of Santander. It was installed on the premises of a velodrome, built a few years earlier near the Magdalena Peninsula. In the square surrounded by the racetrack they placed two cement tennis pitches, complemented by a booth, where the players could change attire.

Two years later, the Santander Consistory decided to give the king Alfonso XIII the strategic peninsula, while starting up the popular initiative to build a summer palace for the Spanish Royal Family. From that moment the elitist club became a popular sport entity much frequented by the Spanish royal family. Consequently, in 1909 King Alfonso assumed the Presidency of Honor of the club, which allowed it to add the prefix "Real".

After this appointment, there was a sharp increase in the number of affiliated members with the consequent expansion of sporting activities and meetings of social and festive character. The construction of new gravel roads and buildings allowed the club to share grounds with the Palacio de la Magdalena. Other activities such as bowling were also incorporated, whose first championship was held in 1933.

In 1945, a hockey team was established.

Second half of the 20th century

With the celebration of the 50th anniversary of the club, the Prince  Juan Carlos I arranged a visit. Years later, the king Juan Carlos I officially accepted the honorary presidency of the club in 1976. After this, many events were held, including the European Tennis Championship held in 1982, the organization of the first edition of the International tennis tournament, now called ATP and the Fed Cup semi-final, played between Spain and Germany in 1995.

21st century

During the 21st century, the club has organized events including the  2000 Davis Cup semi-final, between Spain and the US in which the host country won.

In 2006, the club celebrated its centenary with events including the Spanish National Tennis Championship in both male and female categories, as well as the Spanish National Bowling Tournament and the Spanish National Hockey Championship.

Facilities

The club's facilities are composed of five tennis courts of clay and two synthetic surface courts, a bowling court, a fitness center, 3 swimming pools, a nautical section and senior and youth social buildings.

Hockey

Current squad

Men's squad
Head coach: Borja Movellan

Club Presidents

 1906 – 1910 The Count of Mansilla
 1910 – 1942 Gabriel María de Pombo e Ibarra 
 1942 – 1945 Ángel Jado y Canales 
 1945 – 1948 Miguel Quijano de la Colina 
 1948 – 1957 Ernesto Alday y Redonet 
 1957 – 1960 Rupert Arrarte e Isasi 
 1960               Francisco de Nardiz y Pombo 
 1960 – 1966 Pedro Quijano y González-Camino 
 1966 – 1972 Antonio Zúñiga y García de Chama 
 1974 – 1978 Luis Ortueta y Egido 
 1978 – 1986 José Felipe Arrarte y de la Revilla 
 1986 – 1990 José Ignacio de la Torriente y Oria 
 1990 – 1994 Mariano Moro y Ribalaygua 
 1994 – 2000 Jesús Pellón y Fernández-Fontecha 
 2000               Alfonso Yllera y Palazuelo 
 2000 – 2007 Fernando Bolívar y Fernández 
 2007 – 2011 Carlos Rey y Hoppe 
 2011 – 2015 Enrique Zalduondo y Fernández-Baladrón 
 2015 – 2019 Fernando Cortines y González de Riancho
 2019 –          Ángela Escallada y de Haya

Honours

National honours

 Royal Order of Sports Merit

See also
Real Club de la Puerta de Hierro

References

Sports clubs established in 1906
Multi-sport clubs in Spain
Tennis clubs in Spain
Sport in Santander, Spain
1906 establishments in Spain
Tenis